Michael Festus Wenceslaus Perera (1931 - 2013) was a Sri Lankan politician. He was first elected to parliament representing Wennappuwa at the 6th parliamentary election in 1965. He failed to get re-elected at the subsequent 1970 parliamentary election but was successful at the 8th parliamentary election in 1977. At the 9th parliamentary election the Wennappuwa electorate was replaced by the Puttalam multi-member electoral district. Perera was elected as one of the constituency's members from 1989 to 2001.

Personal life
Perera was married to former member of parliament Larine Perera and is the father of former member of parliament Niroshan Perera. Perera died on 12 January 2013 at the age of 81.

References

1931 births
2013 deaths
Members of the 6th Parliament of Ceylon
Members of the 8th Parliament of Sri Lanka
Members of the 9th Parliament of Sri Lanka
Members of the 10th Parliament of Sri Lanka
Members of the 11th Parliament of Sri Lanka
Sinhalese politicians
United National Party politicians
Sri Lankan Roman Catholics